The Nakayama Grand Jump (中山グランドジャンプ) is a Japanese horse racing steeplechase, held at Nakayama Racecourse every year in mid-April. It is for thoroughbreds, four years old and older, run at a distance of 4250m (2 5/8 miles + 84 feet).

With a purse of over 142,660,000 yen, (about US$1.3 million), the Nakayama Grand Jump is one of the richest steeplechase races in the world.

The race, held as "Nakayama Daishogai spring" until 1998, was first run in 1999.
Its distance was 4100m until 2000.

It is one of two Grade I steeplechase races on Japanese turf; the other is the Nakayama Daishogai, which uses the same racecourse under a slightly different configuration.

The race is run on Nakayama's steeplechase course, which follows a twisted path on the racecourse interior over a series of jumps, inclines and declines. The dirt course is also crossed several times. On the final lap, with about 1200 m (3/4 mile) remaining, horses enter the outer turf course along the backstretch for the race's final three jumps.

The race has been won five times by overseas runners: St Steven (New Zealand 2002), Karasi (Australia 2005, 2006, 2007) and Blackstairmountain (Ireland 2013).

Winners 

(*1):The 1999 race was open to Japanese trained horses only.
(*2):As a result of 2011 Tōhoku earthquake and tsunami, the 2011 race was postponed to July 2, and run over a distance of 4260m. For this year only, three-year-olds were allowed to enter the race. The weight conditions were changed to 61.5 kg for three-year-olds and 63.5 for four-year-olds or above.

External links
 Nakayama Grand Jump at the Japan Association for International Racing and Stud Book website

Horse races in Japan
Steeplechase (horse racing)